Radočelo (Serbian Cyrillic: Радочело) is a mountain in central Serbia, between towns of Ivanjica and Raška. Its highest peak Krivača has an elevation of 1,643 meters above sea level.

Studenica monastery is located on northeastern slopes of the mountain.

References

Mountains of Serbia